Timo Becker may refer to:

 Timo Becker (footballer, born 1989), German footballer
 Timo Becker (footballer, born 1997), German footballer